Vineland–Downstown Airport  is a privately owned, public-use airport in Franklin Township, Gloucester County, New Jersey, United States. It is located four nautical miles (4.6 mi, 7.4 km) northeast of the central business district of Vineland,
a city in Cumberland County.

Facilities and aircraft 
It has two runways with turf surfaces: 2/20 is 2,251 by 100 feet (686 x 30 m) and 12/30 is 1,800 by 100 feet (549 x 30 m).

For the 12-month period ending October 31, 2010, the airport had 1,095 general aviation aircraft operations, an average of 3 per day. At that time there were 21 aircraft based at this airport, all single-engine.

References

External links 
 Vineland–Downstown Airport (28N) page from New Jersey DOT Airport Directory
 Aerial photo as of 10 March 1991 from USGS The National Map

Airports in New Jersey
Transportation buildings and structures in Gloucester County, New Jersey